Rondaninn-a teito a teito is a traditional song from the Italian Liguria region (where the city of Rondanina lies):.

As usual, in traditional music there exist several versions with small variations. One of the common lyrics is

As a result of significant Italian (particularly from Genoa) immigration to Argentina in the late 19th and early 20th century it is well known in the xeneize (Genoese) community.

See also 
 Music of Genoa
 San Beneito article

References

External links 
 Song performed by vocal group "La Rionda"
 Video of an old genovese woman singing it
 Lyric version with italian translation
 Italian popular music

Italian folk music
Italian songs
Culture in Genoa